My Friend Dahmer is a 2012 graphic novel and memoir by artist John "Derf" Backderf about his teenage friendship with Jeffrey Dahmer, who later became a serial killer. The book evolved from a 24-page, self-published version by Backderf in 2002.

Background 
Shortly after Backderf learned about Dahmer's crimes, he met two of his friends, Mike Kukral and Neil, all of whom had befriended Dahmer in school. With the new information regarding Dahmer's fate, many of his odd behaviors in adolescence seemed to make sense. Backderf recorded some of the stories shared in his sketchbook, which would serve as the beginning of My Friend Dahmer. He started focusing on writing the stories in 1994 following Dahmer's death.

Because Backderf worked at Akron Beacon Journal, he also had access to much information about Dahmer's crimes before they became public knowledge, which, combined with his personal history with Dahmer, put him in a perfect situation to shed light on him.

When Backderf initially began creating the comics, he thought of them as a series of mini-comics or as an anthology told from his own perspective. Later, he returned to their high school for a more in-depth, journalistic approach wherein he collected information via interviews and FBI files.

In 1997, My Friend Dahmer was first released in the comic anthology Zero Zero #18 (Fantagraphics, July 1997). Backderf, wanting to write a full-length work, began writing publication proposals using a single chapter; publishers often shied away from the subject matter, fearing the gore associated with Dahmer. Therefore, in 2002, he self-published the work as a 24-page comic.

After twenty years of background research, Backderf drafted the full manuscript in two weeks, and publishers became interested in the story. The final, full-length book was published by Abrams Books in 2012.

Plot 
The novel depicts the author's teenage friendship with Jeffrey Dahmer, who later became an infamous serial killer, during his time at Eastview Junior High and Revere High School. The story follows Dahmer from age 12 up to, but not including, his first murder, two weeks after high school graduation.

Derf, while not excusing or forgiving Dahmer's crimes, presents an empathetic portrait of Dahmer as a lonely young man tormented by inner demons, ridiculed by bullies at school, and neglected by the adults in his life. The graphic novel recalls Dahmer's isolation, his binge drinking, his bizarre behavior to get attention, and his disturbing fascination with roadkill. Backderf and his friends encouraged Dahmer to act out, including faking epileptic seizures in school and the mall and pretending to have cerebral palsy.

Style 
One of Backderf's techniques was drawing Dahmer in shadow as a representation of his personality.

Adaptations 
The original self-published comic book was adapted and staged as a one-act play by the NYU Theater Department.

In 2017, the novel was adapted into a film directed by Marc Meyers and starring Ross Lynch as Jeffrey Dahmer. On the review aggregator website Rotten Tomatoes, the film has an 86% rating based on 88 reviews, with an average rating of 7/10. The website's critical consensus reads, "My Friend Dahmer opens a window into the making of a serial killer whose conclusions are as empathetic as they are deeply troubling." Metacritic, another review aggregator, assigned the film a weighted average score of 68 out of 100, based on 25 critics, indicating "generally favorable reviews."

Reception

Reviews 
My Friend Dahmer was generally well received by critics, including starred reviews from Kirkus Reviews, Publishers Weekly. Kirkus called the book "[a]n exemplary demonstration of the transformative possibilities of graphic narrative." Publishers Weekly called the writing "impeccably honest" and the story "quietly horrifying."

Multiple reviewers also highlighted the book's art style. Booklist noted, "The blunt, ungainly drawings, with their robotically stiff figures, effectively convey the drab suburban milieu." Time's Lev Grossman pointed out that "[t]he psychedelic wavy highlights Backderf draws on glass are like Proust’s madeleine to anybody who was alive in the 1970’s, and the way Backderf draws people owes a lot to Mad magazine’s Don Martin, ... [whose] characters all have those long, angular heads and exaggeratedly articulated joints."

Library Journal called the book "a thoughtfully terrifying look at unmonitored tendencies and careless interactions combining to forge a serial murderer" and said it "is a real butt-kicker for educators and youth counselors as well as peers of other potential Dahmers."

Awards and honors 
In 2012, Publishers Weekly named My Friend Dahmer in their list of the year's top five comics; Lev Grossman, book critic for Time, named it one of his top five nonfiction books of the year; and The A.V. Club named it the year's best nonfiction book.

Controversy 
In 2021, My Friend Dahmer was one of 22 books removed from libraries in Texas's Leander Independent School District "as part of an initiative to prohibit "inappropriate" books in their learning institutions." The book was later returned to shelves with the requirement that readers receive counseling regarding its contents. When asked why he believed the book was banned, Backderf reiterated that the book does not include violence, sex, or profanity. As such, he believes, "People are objecting to what he became, ... not what I depict in my book." Backderf also disagrees with the requirement that students should receive counseling after reading the book.

The following year, the book was listed among 52 books banned by the Alpine School District following the implementation of Utah law H.B. 374, “Sensitive Materials In Schools."

References

2012 graphic novels
Autobiographical graphic novels
American graphic novels
Non-fiction graphic novels
Works about Jeffrey Dahmer
American novels adapted into films
American comics adapted into films
Comics set in the 1970s
Comics set in the 1980s
Comics set in Ohio
Biographical comics
Self-published books
Censored books